The 2003 Mountain West Conference baseball tournament took place from May 21 through 24. All six of the league's teams met in the double-elimination tournament held at University of New Mexico's Isotopes Park. Top seeded UNLV won their first Mountain West Conference Baseball Championship with a championship game score of 14–9 and earned the conference's automatic bid to the 2003 NCAA Division I baseball tournament.

Seeding 
The teams were seeded based on regular season conference winning percentage only. San Diego State claimed the second seed over BYU by winning the season series.

Results 

* - Indicates game required 11 innings.

All-Tournament Team 
The following teams were named to the All-Tournament team.

Most Valuable Player 
Patrick Dobson, an outfielder for the champion UNLV Rebels, was named the tournament Most Valuable Player, after a 3 for 5, 2 RBI performance in the championship game, setting a tournament record for RBI at 14.

References 

Tournament
Mountain West Conference baseball tournament
Mountain West Conference baseball tournament
Mountain West Conference baseball tournament